Antonio González Pacheco (10 October 1946 – 7 May 2020), known also as Billy the Kid (Billy el Niño), was a Spanish police inspector in Francoist Spain who was charged with 13 counts of torture and sought for extradition by an Argentine judge in 2014. María Romilda Servini had called for the indictment. The request for extradition was refused by the Spanish High Court on the basis that the statute of limitations had run out on the accusation against him.

He competed in a half-marathon in Madrid in 2010.

He previously had a pension that was 1.5 times larger than the usual one and he had four medals of honour, which was revealed by a report from the Ministry of the Interior in 2018. That year interior minister Fernando Grande-Marlaska began efforts to determine whether the state can terminate the honours and pensions.

Death
He died on 7 May 2020 from COVID-19 during the COVID-19 pandemic in Spain at the age of 73.

See also
 Political prisoners in Francoist Spain
 Human rights in Spain
 Argentina-Spain relations

References

Francoist Spain
1946 births
2020 deaths
Torturers
Spanish police officers
Deaths from the COVID-19 pandemic in Spain